Omorgus villosus is a beetle of the family Trogidae.

References 

villosus
Beetles described in 1954